Sphingicampa heiligbrodti is a species of giant silkworm moth in the family Saturniidae. It is found in Central America and North America.

References

Further reading

 
 

Ceratocampinae
Articles created by Qbugbot
Moths described in 1877